Carl Petri may refer to:

 Carl Adam Petri (1926–2010), German mathematician and computer scientist
 Carl Axel Petri (1929–2017), Swedish politician and judge